Christopher Irene Imumolen (born 5 September 1983) is the Addo of Abaji, an educationist, a university professor, a serial entrepreneur, a business mogul and a Nigerian Politician. He is the founder of Joint Professional Training and Support International Limited (JPTS) and UNIC Foundation, a non-profit, non governmental organization. He is a presidential candidate on the platform of the Accord Party, ahead of the 2023 Nigerian presidential elections.

Biography  

Imumolen is an indigene of Esan West, Ekpoma in Edo State. He started his work career as a Plant Engineer at BOC Gases Nigeria Plc in February 2005. In 2009, he went on to establish the Joint Professional Training and Support International Limited (JPTS), an educational body that has trained 30,000+ certified Professionals. It is acclaimed that ex-Senator Dino Melaye is as well one of the institution's alumni, following honorary conferment.

Years after establishing JPTS, Imumolen, on the 14th of January, 2014, proceeded to establish the UNIC Foundation, empowerment, and employment scheme that envisions the goal of supporting four million Nigerian businesses every year with grants and granting reliefs and scholarships to widows and students respectively. 

He is President of the Onshore Offshore Oil and Gas Professional and was also appointed as the Senior Technical Adviser to the Akwa-Ibom state government on Oil and Gas matters, he was also the Technical Safety Consultant to NAPECO Kuwait. He is the Founder of Global Wealth System- a business network system setup to empowering entrepreneurs globally with over 450,000 Membership.

Christopher possesses two Ph.D. Academic degrees which are in Engineering Research and Educational Management. He also possesses three Master's degrees and Bachelor's in Mechanical Engineering.

He had his primary education at the Twins Nursery and Primary School, Papa Ajao, Lagos. He had secondary Education in Lagos at the Nigeria Model High School, Idioro, Mushin, Lagos, before he proceeded for his degree and professional qualifications at the University of Benin, the University of Lagos, the International Institute of Management and Technology and Global Wealth University amongst other professional institutions. 

He currently serves as the Addo of Abaji, after his installation by His Royal Highness Adamu Baba Yunusa, the Ona of Abaji, on the 11th of December 2021.

Sequel to his installation, he said “We went to Abaji to support them in terms of community development. We are working with police and appropriate authorities to assist them in security and we are also planning to set up educational institutions whereby we can offer scholarships to the indigenes”.

On February 8, 2022, it was reported that Imumolen launched a two billion naira education scholarship trust fund for entertainers in the entertainment industry of Nigeria. Musicians Small Doctor and B-Red were among the beneficiaries of the scheme. According to news report, he described the trust fund as "a promise to help the well-placed celebrities in a better perception for their millions followers, which will, in turn spur them to begin to believe in education as a sure way to nation building".

In 2019, Imumolen, through his empowerment program supported over 6000 Nigerians with Financial Grant for Businesses between One thousand Dollars to Ten Thousand Dollars each. He followed up with the release of over 200 inmates who were detained for bailable offenses.

On the 30th of January, 2021 the media reported that Imumolen picked a form of Interest with the Accord Party, and announced his intent to run for Nigeria's highest office. He popularly stated that people can't continue to fold their hands with the current state of the nation. Imumolen Irene Christopher-39 Years is the youngest presidential candidate in the 2023 Nigerian Presenditial Election

Sheikh Khalid's Saga 
Report had it that the founder of Islamic Research and Da'awah Foundation, Sheikh Kalid was expelled as the Chief Imam of Apo Legislative Quarters Juma'at Mosque, following his comment about the insecurity reign under the APC Government of Nigeria. Days after the suspension, Imumolen claimed that he, who had recently had a parley with the Imam, predicted his suspension, revealing that he emphatically urged the cleric to expect numerous attacks that will be launched against him.

He went on attack the government on insecurity, stating that security challenges appear to have overwhelmed the All Progressive Congress-led Federal Government.

References 

1983 births
 Living people
 Nigerian politicians
People from Edo State